Pam Shriver was the defending champion and won in the final 6–1, 6–0 against Betsy Nagelsen.

Seeds
The top eight seeds receive a bye into the second round.

  Pam Shriver (Champion)
  Pam Casale (second round)
  Alycia Moulton (quarterfinals)
  Virginia Ruzici (second round, retired)
  Elise Burgin (semifinals)
  Dianne Balestrat (third round)
  Rosalyn Fairbank (third round)
  Annabel Croft (second round)
  Camille Benjamin (third round)
  Anne Minter (third round)
  Sharon Walsh-Pete (first round)
  Robin White (quarterfinals)
  Jo Durie (second round)
  Elizabeth Smylie (first round)

Qualifying

Draw

Finals

Top half

Section 1

Section 2

Bottom half

Section 3

Section 4

References
 1985 Edgbaston Cup Draws
 ITF Tournament Page
 ITF singles results page

Edgbaston Cup - Singles
Singles